Diego Mendieta (13 June 1980 – 3 December 2012) was a Paraguayan professional footballer who played as a forward. His death on 3 December 2012 reportedly caused by cytomegalovirus, an easily  treatable disease, sparked international outrage after it was made known that his club refused to pay his hospital fees, thus resulting in his demise. The club also owed Mendieta an estimated US$12,500 in salaries which had prevented him from returning to his native Paraguay. The International Federation of Professional Footballers (FIFPro), a worldwide representative organisation for professional football players, dubbed his death as a "disgrace for football".

References

External links 
 

1980 births
2012 deaths
Sportspeople from Asunción
Paraguayan footballers
Association football forwards
Johor Darul Ta'zim F.C. players
Persitara Jakarta Utara players
Persis Solo players
Paraguayan expatriate footballers
Paraguayan expatriate sportspeople in Malaysia
Expatriate footballers in Malaysia
Paraguayan expatriate sportspeople in Indonesia
Expatriate footballers in Indonesia
Infectious disease deaths in Indonesia